Ishaq Bux (15 June 1917 – 2 September 2000) was an Indian actor.

His first screen appearance was in BBC TV's The English Family Robinson, in 1957.

On stage, he appeared with the National Theatre Company at the Old Vic in Tony Harrison's Phaedra Britannica in 1975.

He is best remembered by his roles of Omar in Raiders of the Lost Ark (1981) and the fakir in Octopussy (1983).

Bux was diagnosed with terminal lung cancer in July 2000 and died in a London hospice on 2 September 2000, aged 83.

Career

Film
Nine Hours to Rama (1963) - Gardener
Man in the Middle (1963) - Indian bearer
Inadmissible Evidence (1968) - Watson's Guest
Leo the Last (1970) - Supermarket Manager
The Raging Moon (1971) - Pakistani
The Horseman (1971) - Amjad Kahn (uncredited)
The Vault of Horror (1973) - Fakir (segment 3 "This Trick'ill Kill You")
S*P*Y*S (1974) - Indian Agent (uncredited)
Barry McKenzie Holds His Own (1974)
The Rocky Horror Picture Show (1975) - The Transylvanians #4
Double Exposure (1976) - First Arab
Carry On Emmannuelle (1978) - Plane passenger (uncredited) 
Raiders of the Lost Ark (1981) - Omar
The Missionary (1982) - Maharajah
Privates on Parade (1982) - Sikh Doorman
Octopussy (1983) - Fakir (uncredited)
A Passage to India (1984) - Selim

Television

BBC Sunday Night Theatre (1957-1959) - Ismail / Achmed / Second Bearer
The Indian Tales of Rudyard Kipling (1964)
Theatre 625 - The Serang (1965)
Play of the Month (1965) - Quasim Ali 
Dixon of Dock Green (1968) - Ibrahim 
W. Somerset Maugham (1969) - Old Indian
ITV Saturday Night Theatre (1969) - Bamjibinarse
Department S (1969) - Turkish Club Patron
On the Buses (1970) - Ahmed 
Wicked Women (1970) - Old man 
The Onedin Line (1971) - Man in Bar
Softly Softly: Task Force (1972) - Panni 
The Regiment (1973) - Nari Dastoor 
Crown Court (1973–1979) - Mr.Patel / Akbar Nawaz Rana / Surinder Singh Sandhu 
Oh, Father! (1973) - Indian 
Six Days of Justice (1973–1975) - Magistrate
It Ain't Half Hot Mum (1974–1981) - Stationmaster / Fortune-Telling Wallah / Sword Seller / Indian Trader / Garage Owner 
Machinegunner (1976) - Mr. Pradesh
Play for Today (1978–1981) - Sheikh / Amina's Father 
Quatermass (1979) - Misru 
The Jewel in the Crown (1984) - Aziz 
Minder (1984) - Elderly Indian Man 
The Singing Detective (1986) TV mini-series - Patient 
The Sign of Four (1987, TV Movie) - Lal Chowder (final appearance)

References

External links

1917 births
2000 deaths
Indian emigrants to the United Kingdom
Indian male stage actors
Indian male television actors
Indian male film actors
20th-century Indian male actors
People from Kanpur